The Ruentex Nangang Station Complex is a set of twin skyscrapers located in Nangang District, Taipei, Taiwan. The towers, designed by the Japanese and Taiwanese architectural teams Nikken Sekkei and An-Hsien Lee Architects & Associates, started construction in 2011 and was completed in 2014.

Block A mainly contains offices. Levels 7 to 8 houses OBI Pharma, Inc.; levels 9 to 16 houses HSBC Taiwan and Intel Taiwan branch announced the opening of its new Nangang office on December 4, 2015, which occupies the 17th to 30th floors. On the other hand, Block B houses Courtyard Taipei, which is a Courtyard by Marriott hotel, from the 7th to 30th floors. It has a total of 465 rooms and is one of the top luxury hotels in Nangang. The restaurants include Cantonese cuisine and a lounge bar serving seasonal selection and signature cocktails. The lower floors of the complex houses Nangang station.

Gallery

See also 
 List of tallest buildings in Taiwan
 List of tallest buildings in Taipei
 Nangang District, Taipei
 Courtyard by Marriott
 Nangang station
 Global Mall Nangang Station

References

2015 establishments in Taiwan
Office buildings completed in 2015
Skyscraper office buildings in Taipei
Courtyard by Marriott hotels
Skyscraper hotels in Taipei
Twin towers